2BiC (Hangul: 투빅; short for To Be Continued) is a South Korean duo formed by Nextar Entertainment in Seoul, South Korea. They debuted on March 14, 2012, with "Made Yet Another Woman Cry".

Members
 Jihwan (지환)
 Junhyung (준형)

Discography

Studio albums

Extended plays

Single albums

Singles

Collaborations

Soundtrack appearances

References

Musical groups from Seoul
Musical groups established in 2012
2012 establishments in South Korea
South Korean musical duos